Yandruwandha is an Australian Aboriginal language of the Pama–Nyungan family. Yawarawarga is considered a dialect by Dixon (2002), a closely related language by Bowern (2001). It is also known as Yawarrawarrka, Yawarawarka, Yawarawarga, Yawarawarka, Jauraworka, and Jawarawarka).

The traditional language region includes Far Western Queensland around the local government area of the Shire of Diamantina extending into the Outback Communities Authority of South Australia towards Innamincka.

References

Further reading 

 Breen, Gavan (2015). Innamincka talk: a grammar of the Innamincka dialect of Yandruwandha with notes on other dialects. ANU Press.

Karnic languages